Tom or Thomas Payne was an African-American man who was murdered in Willis, Texas, on February 1, 1927. Arrested in connection with a suspected assault and murder, he was taken by a white mob and hanged from a tree.

References

External links

1927 deaths
1927 in Texas
1927 murders in the United States
People murdered in Texas
Lynching deaths in Texas
Racially motivated violence against African Americans
Murdered African-American people
Race-related controversies in the United States
African-American history between emancipation and the civil rights movement
White American riots in the United States
History of racism in Texas
February 1927 events
African-American history of Texas
Prisoners murdered in custody
Anti-black racism in the United States
Montgomery County, Texas
Crimes in Texas